101 Gang Songs is an LP recorded in December 1960  by Bing Crosby for his own company, Project Records and distributed by Warner Bros. (W 2R-1401) and the RCA Victor Record Club in 1961 with lyric sheets to help the listener join in with the singing. Spread over two records, the album consists of twenty-four medleys of 101 old songs (hence the album's title) in a sing-along format. ("Gang" is meant in the sense of a group of friends, not a street gang or work gang.) Bing Crosby sings on most of the tracks. Those that aren't are marked with an asterisk. The chorus and orchestra accompaniment, arranged and conducted by Jack Halloran, was pre-recorded with Crosby over-dubbing his vocals.

This original double LP was also released as two separate albums under the titles, Join Bing in a Gang Song Sing Along in September 1961 and Join Bing and Sing Along-51 Good Time Songs in January 1962.

The albums were released on CD in 2017 by Sepia Records.

Selected tracks from the albums and from the earlier Join Bing and Sing Along record were later re-dubbed over a children's chorus, arranged and conducted by Jack Halloran, which was recorded on 17–19 May 1961. It was issued later to children's camps as Sing Along With Bing.

Reception
Variety reviewed the album saying "Bing Crosby is slowly moving into Mitch Miller's territory. Crosby's first sing along package did quite well in the market and this compilation of 50 faves has a good chance to do even better. The formula is light and simple and with Crosby leading the way the sing-along is easy to follow."

High Fidelity Magazine: "Mitch Miller may have started (or at least resurrected) the 'sing-along' craze, but it has taken the Old Master to supply the definitive triumph of this genre. He's in his jauntiest form here, leading a usually robust chorus, backed by a vigorously steady rhythm section in performances which imperiously demand participation."

Track listing

*Non-Bing – orchestra and chorus only

References 

1961 albums
Bing Crosby albums
Warner Records albums
Sing-along albums